Snakecharmer is the eighth studio album by the Danish rock band Sort Sol and the sixth under that name after renaming from the earlier Sods.

The album was released on April 3, 2001, by Mercury Records. It was their first album in five years since Unspoiled Monsters (1996). The album reached number one in Denmark, and was certified gold by the International Federation of the Phonographic Industry (IFPI) for shipments of 25,000 copies.

Track listing
"I'll Take Care of You" – 4:46 (Jørgensen/Top-Galia)
"It's Gonna Rain" – 4:10 (Jørgensen/Top-Galia)
"Brogue" – 4:34 (Jørgensen/Top-Galia)
"Rhinestone" – 3:58 (Odde)
"Next Century" – 3:38 (Jørgensen/Top-Galia)
"Elia Rising" (featuring Sissel) – 4:25 (Odde)
"Who's Afraid of Virginia Woolf" – 2:39 (Odde/Odde, Top-Galia, Ortved)
"Daddy Howard in Queens" – 3:36 (Odde/Odde-Ortved)
"Nights in White Satin" – 4:57 (Hayward)

Personnel
Sort Sol
 Steen Jørgensen – vocals
 Tomas Ortved – drums
 Lars Top-Galia – lead guitar
 Knud Odde – bass guitar

Additional musicians and production
 Henrik Lindstrand – arranging and conducting on "I'll Take Care Of You"
 Wili Jønsson – additional bass guitar and keyboard on "I'll Take Care Of You", "Elia Rising" and "Night In White Satin"
 Sissel – duet on "Elia Rising"
 Per Sunding – backing vocals on "I'll Take Care Of You", "Rhinestone" and "Daddy Howard In Queens"
 Mark Linn – backing vocals on "Brogue", "Next Century" and "Who's Afraid Of Virginia Wolf"
 Alex Nyborg Madsen – backing vocals on "Who's Afraid Of Virginia Wolf"
 Mathias Toksværd – turntables on "It's Gonna Rain", "Brogue" and "Next Century"
 Laust Sonne – additional drums and percussion on "I'll Take Care Of You"
 S. Andersson – saxophone on "Who's Afraid Of Virginia Wolf"
 Jeppe Kaas – strings and horn on "Elia Rising"
 Stage – additional rhythm guitar and keyboard on "Rhinestone" and "Daddy Howard In Queens"
 Per Sunding – production
 Michael Ilbert – mixing
 George Marino – mastering

Charts and certifications

Charts

Certifications

References 

2001 albums
Sort Sol albums
Mercury Records albums